The Hugo Award for Best Professional Artist  is given each year for artists of works related to science fiction or fantasy released in the previous calendar year. The award has been given annually under several names since 1955, with the exception of 1957. The Hugo Awards have been described as "a fine showcase for speculative fiction" and "the best known literary award for science fiction writing".

The inaugural 1953 Hugo awards recognized "Best Interior Illustrator" and "Best Cover Artist" categories, awarded to Virgil Finlay and a tie between Hannes Bok and Ed Emshwiller, respectively. The Best Professional Artist award was simply named "Best Artist" in 1955 and 1956, was not awarded in 1957, and was named "Outstanding Artist" in 1958, finally changing to its current name the following year. Beginning in 1996 Retrospective Hugo Awards, or "Retro Hugos", have been available to be awarded for years 50, 75, or 100 years prior in which no awards were given. To date, Retro Hugo awards have been awarded for 1939, 1941, 1943–1946, 1951, and 1954, and in each case an award for professional artist was given.

During the 75 nomination years, 91 artists have been nominated; 25 of these have won, including co-winners and Retro Hugos. Michael Whelan has received the most awards, with 13 wins out of 24 nominations. Frank Kelly Freas has 11 wins and 28 nominations, the most nominations of any artist. Other artists with large numbers of wins or nominations include Bob Eggleton with 8 wins out of 23 nominations, Virgil Finlay with 5 out of 14, Ed Emshwiller with 4 out of 9, John Picacio with 3 out of 15, and Don Maitz with 2 out of 17. David A. Cherry and Thomas Canty are tied for the most nominations without an award at 10 each.

Selection
Hugo Award nominees and winners are chosen by supporting or attending members of the annual World Science Fiction Convention, or Worldcon, and the presentation evening constitutes its central event. The selection process is defined in the World Science Fiction Society Constitution as instant-runoff voting with six nominees, except in the case of a tie. The works on the ballot are the six most-nominated by members that year, with no limit on the number of works that can be nominated. The awards in 1955 and 1958 did not include any recognition of runner-up artists, but since 1959 all six candidates have been recorded. Initial nominations are made by members in January through March, while voting on the ballot of six nominations is performed roughly in April through July, subject to change depending on when that year's Worldcon is held. Prior to 2017, the final ballot was five works; it was changed that year to six, with each initial nominator limited to five nominations. Worldcons are generally held near Labor Day, and in a different city around the world each year.

Winners and nominees 
In the following tables, the years correspond to the date of the ceremony. Artists are eligible based on their work of the previous calendar year. Entries with a blue background and an asterisk (*) next to the artist's name have won the award; those with a white background are the nominees on the short-list.

  *   Winners

Retro Hugos 
Beginning with the 1996 Worldcon, the World Science Fiction Society created the concept of "Retro Hugos", in which the Hugo award could be retroactively awarded for 50, 75, or 100 years prior. Retro Hugos may only be awarded for years in which a Worldcon was hosted, but no awards were originally given. Retro Hugos have been awarded eight times, for 1939, 1941, 1943–1946, 1951, and 1954.

Explanatory notes

References

External links
 Hugo Award official site

Professional Artist
Awards established in 1953
Visual arts awards